Hilton McRae (born 28 December 1949) is a Scottish actor, working in theatre, television and film.

Career
McRae was part of the radical theatre group 7:84 before graduating from the University of Edinburgh, and by 1977 he had joined the Royal Shakespeare Company. He has concentrated mainly on avant-garde and political theatre.

His most mainstream American film role was as Arvel Crynyd in Return of the Jedi; he was uncredited for his brief appearance. In the UK he had substantial roles in The French Lieutenant's Woman and Greystoke: The Legend of Tarzan.

He has performed in several musicals on the London stage, including Mamma Mia!  and Miss Saigon, in which he played the part of The Engineer. He performed the role of Mr Stopnick in the UK premiere of Caroline, or Change at the National Theatre, which won the Best Musical Award from the London newspaper the Evening Standard. In 2008 he played the part of Scarecrow in the Southbank's production of The Wizard of Oz.

In 2006, he acted in Rabbit, a play by Nina Raine which opened at the Old Red Lion Theatre in London, and then transferred to the Trafalgar Studios, Whitehall.

McRae starred in the play The Kreutzer Sonata, based on Tolstoy's novella, which opened at the Gate Theatre in London in 2009 with McRae in the solo role. The play was revived for a second run in 2012. The production also later transferred to New York City. McRae's performance received acclaim both in the UK from many top publications, and in the U.S. from the New York Times.

Personal life
McRae was born in Dundee. He is married to actress Lindsay Duncan, with whom he has a son, Cal McRae (born September 1991).

A close friend and University of Edinburgh classmate of Ian Charleson, McRae contributed a chapter to the 1990 book, For Ian Charleson: A Tribute.

Filmography

Television

References

External links

1949 births
Alumni of the University of Edinburgh
Living people
People from Dundee
Scottish male film actors
Scottish male stage actors
Scottish male television actors
Scottish male voice actors
Male actors from Dundee
20th-century Scottish male actors
21st-century Scottish male actors